Arthur Shrewsbury (4 July 1874 – 6 October 1917) was an English cricketer.  Shrewsbury was a right-handed batsman who bowled right-arm medium pace.  He was born in Nottingham.

Shrewsbury made his first-class debut for Nottinghamshire against Sussex in the 1892 County Championship.  He played 2 further first-class matches for the county in 1892, which came against Gloucestershire and Somerset.  In his 3 first-class matches, he scored 63 runs at a batting average of 31.50, with a high score of 31*.  In the field he took a single catch.

He died in Nottingham on 6 October 1917 and was buried at All Hallows Church in Gedling.

Family
His father William played first-class cricket for Nottinghamshire, as did his uncle Arthur who also played Test cricket for England.

References

External links
Arthur Shrewsbury at Cricinfo (paywall)
Arthur Shrewsbury at CricketArchive

1874 births
1917 deaths
Cricketers from Nottingham
English cricketers
Nottinghamshire cricketers
Burials in Nottinghamshire